Montebello Park is a public park in downtown St. Catharines, Ontario, Canada, designed by Frederick Law Olmsted. It features a commemorative rose garden with over 1,300 bushes in 25 varieties is the city's largest rose collection and an ornamental fountain. The focal point of the park is a historic band shell and pavilion used for festivals. The park is designated under the Ontario Heritage Act.

History

The City of St. Catharines purchased the site in 1887 for the city's first public park, commissioning Frederick Law Olmsted to design the park, who had created New York City's Central Park.

A pavilion was constructed on the foundation of the original Merritt estate in 1888. A covered circular bandstand modelled after the one built for the Pan-American Exposition in Buffalo, New York was constructed in the park by Edwin Nicholson, builder of the Henley Grandstand in Port Dalhousie, in 1904.

References

External links
Official City of St. Catharines page for Montebello Park

Municipal parks in Ontario
St. Catharines